Arthur Reeves (1837 – 1915) was an English football manager who managed Stoke.

Career
Reeves was born in Stoke-upon-Trent and took over as manager of Stoke in January 1892 from the departed Joseph Bradshaw. After four months in charge Reeves knew he had a lot of work to do as Stoke finished next to bottom of the First Division in 1891–92. But after a lot of hard work and a lot of effort on Reeves' part, the players responded and at the end of the next campaign Stoke claimed a welcome mid-table position. Reeves' gambled blending local born stars like Bill Rowley, Tommy Clare and Alf Underwood with Scottish imports Davy Brodie, Davy Christie and Billy Dickson a combination that initially worked well. After an 11th-place finish in 1893–94 Stoke had a tough 1894–95 season which saw them enter the end of season test match to remain in the top-flight, they beat Newton Heath 3–0 to see them safe. It was not enough to keep Reeves in charge of Stoke and he was replaced by the club's goalkeeper, Bill Rowley.

Career statistics

References

External links
 Stoke City managers at stokecityfc.com

1860 births
1915 deaths
English footballers
English football managers
Stoke City F.C. managers
English Football League managers
Association footballers not categorized by position